Judge Sanchez may refer to:

Gabriel P. Sanchez (born 1976), judge of the United States Court of Appeals for the Ninth Circuit
Juan Ramon Sánchez (born 1955), judge of the United States District Court for the Eastern District of Pennsylvania

See also
Judge Sanchez, a minor character in Judge Dredd media